Parçikan is a Kurdish tribe residing mainly in Elazığ Province in Turkey. The tribe numbers around 20,000 members and are predominantly Sunni Muslims. The tribe is transhumant nomadic.

History 
The tribe lived around Azerbaijan and Iran before migrating westward after the Mongol invasion and settled around Baskil which during the period of the governance of Aq Qoyunlu, Safavid Iran and the Ottoman Empire went under the name of Hersini. In the 17th century, Hersini was densely populated by Kurdish tribes, including Parçikan but also the Zeyve and Herdi tribes. Due to the heavy tax obligations in the Sanjak of Harput, some members of the tribe dispersed to surrounding areas. In addition, some tribe members were forcefully settled in various places in Anatolia. According to tribe leader Dursun Demez, the Ottomans handed over the Sarıçiçek Plateau in Kemaliye district to his tribe in 1245 by an edict, allowing the tribe to use the land for nomadic pastoralism. In 2019, the tribe pushed for state recognition to make the plateau Parçikan land.

In 1921, the tribe expressed its support for the Koçgiri rebellion after Nuri Dersimi approached the tribe for support. As the rebellion grew, Parçikan Kurds ultimately joined in. Tribal leaders also supported the 2010 Turkish constitutional referendum put forward by AKP.

Geography
The Parçikan tribe lives in the following towns and villages:

In Elazığ Province

Akçakale, center district
Akgömlek, Keban
Aladikme village, Baskil
Alatarla village, center district
Altınkuşak village, center district
Altınkürek village, Keban
Aşağıçakmak village, Keban
Bulutlu village, center district
Çalica village, center district
Çavuşlu village, Baskil
Demirlibahçe village, Baskil
Düğüntepe village, Baskil
Eskiköy village, Baskil
Gözpınar village, center district
Günbağı village, Keban
Habibuşağı village, Baskil
Harabekayış village, Baskil
Işıkyolu village, center district
Karaali village, Baskil
Karaali village, center district
Karagedik village, Baskil
Koçharmanı village, center district
Koparuşağı village, center district
Kurşunkaya village, Keban
Kutlugün village, Baskil
Meydancık village, Baskil
Ortaçalı village, center district
Sakabaşı village, center district
Şahaplı village, Baskil
Sarıtaş village, Baskil
Taşkesen village, Keban
Tatlıpayam village, Baskil
Temurköy, center district
Topaluşağı village, Baskil
Yalındamlar village, center district
Yolçatı village, center district

Other settlements
Parçikan village (formerly named Bozburun), Arguvan, Malatya Province

Notes

Bibliography 

History of Elazığ Province
Kurdish tribes